Phengaris xiushani is a species of butterfly of the family Lycaenidae. It is only known from Yunnan in China.

The forewing length is 21 mm for males. The female is similar, but slightly larger and the black margins of both wings are well developed.

The species occurs together with Phengaris atroguttata in one locality, which is probably their usual habitat within undisturbed forested mountains.

Etymology
The specific name refers to the beautiful mountain on the slopes of which it was found (Xiu-Shan in Chinese means “beautiful mountain”), and to Dr. Xiushan LI who brought the two authors of this description together and who has committed much of his life to research
on ecology and conservation of butterflies.

External links
Notes on and key to the genus Phengaris (s. str.) (Lepidoptera, Lycaenidae) from mainland China with description of a new species

Phengaris